Lotoshinsky District is an administrative and municipal district (raion), one of the thirty-six in Moscow Oblast, Russia. It is located in the northwest of the oblast and borders with Tver Oblast in the north and west, Volokolamsky District in the southeast, Shakhovskoy District in the southwest, and with Klinsky District in the east. Its administrative center is the urban locality (a work settlement) of Lotoshino. Population: 17,859 (2010 Census);  The population of Lotoshino accounts for 31.1% of the district's total population.

Geography
About 40% of the district's territory is covered by forests. Major rivers flowing through the district include the Lama and the Lob.

History
The district was created in 1929.

References

Notes

Sources

Districts of Moscow Oblast